Sergio Blázquez Sánchez (born 30 July 1990), commonly known as Tekio, is a Spanish professional footballer who plays for UD Logroñés as a right-back.

Career
Born in Molina de Segura, Region of Murcia, Tekio made his senior debuts with CD Molinense in the 2007–08 campaign, in the regional leagues. After a brief spell at Murcia Deportivo CF (only registered with the youth sides, however), he joined Tercera División club UCAM Murcia CF in June 2009.

In the 2011 summer Tekio joined Real Valladolid B also in the fourth level, and appeared with the main squad during the whole pre-season. He played his first match as a professional on 3 September, starting in a 2–0 home success over Córdoba in the Segunda División.

Tekio eventually returned to the B-team in December 2011, and rescinded his link with the Pucelanos on 17 January 2013. He signed for former team UCAM Murcia, now in the Segunda División B, in the following day.

Volos 

On 3 June 2021,  Greek Super League club Volos announced they awarded Tekio with a renewal of his contract, being one of the key players for the successful 2020–21 season.

One month later, on 6 July 2021, they announced his release and transfer to Spanish 3rd tier Logroñés.

References

External links
 
 
 
 
 

1990 births
Living people
Sportspeople from the Province of Valladolid
Spanish footballers
Footballers from Castile and León
Association football defenders
Segunda División players
Segunda División B players
Tercera División players
UCAM Murcia CF players
Real Valladolid Promesas players
Real Valladolid players
Elche CF players
Volos N.F.C. players
UD Logroñés players
Spanish expatriate footballers
Expatriate footballers in Greece
Spanish expatriate sportspeople in Greece